Acroricnus seductor is a species of wasp belonging to the family Ichneumonidae.

Subspecies
Species within this genus include:
 Acroricnus seductor elegans (Mocsáry, 1883)
 Acroricnus seductor syriacus (Mocsáry, 1883)

Biology
These ichneumonid wasps parasite larvae of Sceliphron spirifex, Sceliphron destillatorium and Sceliphron caementarium. Females of this species deposit eggs inserting the ovipositor through the mud wall of their host nest.

Distribution
This species is present in Europe, in the Near East, in North Africa and in the Oriental ecozone.

References

External links
 Aramel.free

Cryptinae
Insects described in 1786
Hymenoptera of Europe